Rasteirinha (or Ragafunk) is a Brazilian electronic music genre that derives from funk carioca, reggaeton, samba and axé. The rhythm was originated from favelas and DJs like Mulú, DJ Comrade, Munchi and Buraka Som Sistema spread it to the world.

Examples of Rasteirinha songs
 MC WM - "Fuleragem"
 Preta Gil, Gloria Groove - "Só o Amor"
 Mulú - "Patrão"
 Pabllo Vittar, Thalía - "Tímida"

See also 
 Moombahton
 Tecno brega

References 

Brazilian styles of music
Funk carioca genres